Musa Kallon (born 8 April 1970, in Kenema, Sierra Leone) is a retired footballer and current coach in Sierra Leone. He is the older brother of Sierra Leonean international footballers Mohamed Kallon, and Kemokai Kallon.

Playing career

Club 
As a footballer, Kallon played as a midfielder for Vanspor (1994–1995) in Turkey, Sportul Studenţesc București (1995–1996) in Romania, and PSM Makassar, Persikota Tangerang and Persebaya Surabaya (1996–1999) in Indonesia.

International 
Kallon was capped several times for Sierra Leone between 1990 and 1998, and scored two goals in a 5–1 win against Niger in order to qualify Sierra Leone qualify for the 1996 African Cup of Nations in South Africa.

Coaching career 
After retiring as a player, Kallon also coached the Sierra Leone U-17 side in the 2003 FIFA U-17 World Championship in Finland after managing a second place finish in the 2003 African U-17 Championship.

In 2007 he coached Central Parade.

Kallon coached Kallon F.C. to a runners up position in the 2004–05 League Championship. He fell out with his players, management and his younger brother, however, who later sacked him. In 2005, Kallon was banned for a year after forcefully stopping a league match between Kallon FC and Diamond Stars by letting his daughter sit down in the centre of the field, after the players refused to play under him.

On 9 February 2016, Kallon was sacked by Old Edwardians.

Honours

Player
Mighty Blackpool
Sierra Leone National Premier League: 1998
Sierra Leonean FA Cup: 1988
Union Douala
Cameroon Premiere Division: 1990
RC Bafoussam
Cameroon Première Division: 1992, 1993

References

External links
 Indonesian Article
 
 
 FIFA article on the 2003 Sierra Leone U-17 team

Living people
Vanspor footballers
FC Sportul Studențesc București players
Süper Lig players
Liga I players
Sierra Leone international footballers
Sierra Leonean football managers
Sierra Leonean footballers
Expatriate footballers in Turkey
Expatriate footballers in Romania
Expatriate footballers in Indonesia
Sierra Leonean expatriate sportspeople in Romania
1996 African Cup of Nations players
Sierra Leonean expatriate sportspeople in Turkey
1970 births
Association football midfielders
People from Kenema